Buddleja pulchella is endemic to the open mountain forest of South Africa, Zimbabwe, Kenya and Tanzania at elevations of 1,200 – 2,000 m. The species was first named and described by N. E. Brown in 1894.

Description
Buddleja pulchella is a sprawling shrub or tree less than 10 m tall and up to twice as wide. The leaves are opposite or sub-opposite with petioles 5–10 mm long. The sweetly scented flowers are white or pale cream with orange throats, and borne in lax terminal panicles.

Cultivation
The species was introduced to the UK from the Durban Botanic Garden in 1894, but is not known to remain in cultivation. Hardiness: USDA zones 8–9.

References

pulchella
Flora of Kenya
Flora of South Africa
Flora of Tanzania
Flora of Zimbabwe
Flora of Africa
Taxa named by N. E. Brown